Charles Passmore Graham  (19 December 192711 February 2021) was a lieutenant general in the United States Army who served as commander of the Second United States Army. He graduated from the United States Military Academy in 1950 with a B.S. degree in engineering. Graham also earned an M.S. degree in mechanical engineering from the University of Michigan in 1957. After his death in 2021, he was interred at Fort Sam Houston National Cemetery.

References

1927 births
2021 deaths
People from Seward, Alaska
United States Military Academy alumni
University of Michigan alumni
United States Army personnel of the Vietnam War
Recipients of the Air Medal
Recipients of the Meritorious Service Medal (United States)
Recipients of the Legion of Merit
United States Army generals
Burials at Fort Sam Houston National Cemetery